The following is a partial list of the "D" codes for Medical Subject Headings (MeSH), as defined by the United States National Library of Medicine (NLM).

This list continues the information at List of MeSH codes (D25). Codes following these are found at List of MeSH codes (D27). For other MeSH codes, see List of MeSH codes.

The source for this content is the set of 2006 MeSH Trees from the NLM.

– pharmaceutical preparations

– designer drugs

– dosage forms
  – capsules
  – colloids
  – aerosols
  – aerosol propellants
  – emulsions
  – fat emulsions, intravenous
  – gels
  – hydrogels
  – hydrogel
  – suspensions
  – delayed-action preparations
  – drug implants
  – tablets, enteric-coated
  – drug carriers
  – liposomes
  – virosomes
  – liniments
  – ointments
  – pharmaceutical solutions
  – ophthalmic solutions
  – powders
  – suppositories
  – tablets
  – tablets, enteric-coated
  – vaginal creams, foams and jellies

– drug combinations

– drugs, chinese herbal

– drugs, essential

– drugs, generic

– drugs, investigational

– drugs, non-prescription

– materia medica

– nostrums

– pharmaceutic aids
  – adjuvants, pharmaceutic
  – ointment bases
  – preservatives, pharmaceutical
  – vehicles
  – excipients

– placebos

– plant extracts

– prodrugs

– solutions
  – contact lens solutions
  – hypertonic solutions
  – glucose solution, hypertonic
  – saline solution, hypertonic
  – hypotonic solutions
  – isotonic solutions
  – organ preservation solutions
  – pharmaceutical solutions
  – cardioplegic solutions
  – dialysis solutions
  – hemodialysis solutions
  – ophthalmic solutions
  – sclerosing solutions
  – rehydration solutions

– street drugs
  – crack cocaine

– vaginal creams, foams and jellies

– veterinary drugs

– xenobiotics

The list continues at List of MeSH codes (D27).

D26